"Summer Suspicion" (Japanese: サマー・サスピション) is the debut single by Kiyotaka Sugiyama & Omega Tribe, released by VAP on April 21, 1983. The single reached at #9 on the Oricon charts.

Background 
Initially, the song "Umikaze Tsushin" was the candidate for their debut song, but producer Koichi Fujita did not want the song to be used as the debut, saying "It's not too bad, but could you write another song? I'd like it to have a more melodic melody and crying." The song was created after.

One month before the release of the single, Kiyotaka Sugiyama performed the song at the 12th Tokyo Music Festival, held at the Nippon Budokan on March 27, 1983. He then appeared on the Tokyo Broadcasting System program Apple City 500, promoting the song. The song was first shown at the TBS TV program "The Best Ten" on August 4, 1983, then on the Nippon TV program The Top Ten on July 11, 1983. The single ranked in the top 10's on both programs.

The single was included in their debut album Aqua City, which released on September 21, 1983. It was included in the albums Single's History and was planned to also be included on the album Kamasami Kong DJ Special until the project was scrapped. Kiyotaka Sugiyama covered the song on his albums Hula Moon Sessions and I Am Me.

Track listing

Charts

Weekly charts

Year-end charts

References 

Omega Tribe (Japanese band) songs
1983 songs
1983 debut singles
Songs with lyrics by Chinfa Kan
Songs written by Tetsuji Hayashi